Ditomyia fasciata is a species of fly in the family Ditomyiidae.

References

Ditomyiidae
Insects described in 1818